Godric may refer to:

People
Godric of Finchale (c. 1060–1170), Anglo-Saxon saint
Godric, a novel by Frederick Buechner about Godric of Finchdale
Godric of Mappestone (fl. 1086), Anglo-Saxon thane and landowner mentioned in the Domesday Book
Godric the Sheriff (died 1066), 11th-century sheriff of Buckinghamshire and Berkshire
Godric the Steward (died c. 1114) steward of Ralph de Gael
Godric of Winchcombe, a medieval abbot of Winchcombe Abbey

Fiction
 Godric, known as Godfrey, a character in the Southern Vampire Mysteries novels by Charlaine Harris
 Godric (True Blood), a fictional character in the television series True Blood adapted from the Southern Vampire Mysteries novels
 Godric (novel), a 1981 Pulitzer-nominated book by Frederick Buechner about Godric of Finchale
 Godric Gryffindor, a fictional character in the Harry Potter universe
 Godric's Hollow, a fictional place in the Harry Potter universe

 Godric the Golden a fictional demigod in the videogame Elden Ring. He is mostly known for being the lord of all that is golden and his catchphrase "I command thee, kneel!". He is also referred to as 'Godric the Grafted'.